Corpus Christi ("body of Christ" in Latin) may refer to:
 Feast of Corpus Christi, a Christian solemnity which honors the institution of the Holy Eucharist

City in Texas
 Corpus Christi, Texas, United States
 Corpus Christi Bay
 Corpus Christi Hooks, a minor league baseball team
 Corpus Christi International Airport
 Corpus Christi Independent School District
 Naval Air Station Corpus Christi

Churches
 Corpus Christi Catholic Church (Fort Dodge, Iowa), listed on the National Register of Historic Places listings in Woodbury County, Iowa
 Corpus Christi R. C. Church Complex, listed on the National Register of Historic Places listings in Erie County, New York
 Corpus Christi Church (New York)
 Corpus Christi Cathedral (Corpus Christi, Texas)
 Corpus Christi Catholic Church (Celebration, Florida)
 Corpus Christi Catholic Church (Aliso Viejo, California)
 Corpus Christi Catholic Church (Drumcondra, Dublin)

Educational institutions
 Corpus Christi Catholic High School, Wollongong, New South Wales, Australia
 Corpus Christi College, Melbourne, Victoria, Australia
 Corpus Christi College, Perth, Western Australia
 Corpus Christi College (Vancouver), British Columbia
 Corpus Christi Catholic Secondary School, in Burlington, Ontario
 Pallikoodam or Corpus Christi High School, a school in Kottayam, Kerala, India
 Corpus Christi College, Cambridge
 Corpus Christi College, Oxford
 Corpus Christi Catholic College, Leeds, West Yorkshire, United Kingdom
 Corpus Christi Roman Catholic High School, Cardiff
 Texas A&M University–Corpus Christi

Music
 Corpus Christi Records, a record label
 Corpus Christi (band), a Christian metal band from Cincinnati, Ohio
 Corpus Christi (Angkor Wat album) (1990)
 Corpus Christi (Syven album) (2012)
 "Corpus Christi Carol", a Middle English hymn or carol
"Corpus Christi", a 2019 song by Kevin Abstract from Arizona Baby

Ships
 USS Corpus Christi (PF-44), a Tacoma-class frigate that served in World War II
 USS City of Corpus Christi (SSN-705), a Los Angeles-class submarine

Other uses
 Corpus Christi (2014 film), a 2014 Venezuelan film
 Corpus Christi (2019 film), a 2019 Polish film
 Corpus Christi (play), a 1996 play by Terrence McNally
 Corpus Christi: Playing with Redemption, a 2011 film about the staging of the play
 Among other names, the n-Town Plays have been named "the Play Called Corpus Christi"

See also
 Corpus Christi Cathedral (disambiguation)
 Corpus Christi Church (disambiguation)
 Corpus Christi High School (disambiguation)
 Corpus Domini (disambiguation)